The 2011 Doncaster Metropolitan Borough Council election took place on 5 May 2011 to elect one third of Doncaster Metropolitan Borough Council as part of the 2011 local elections in the United Kingdom.

The election resulted in the Labour Party retaining its control of the council, increasing its majority by seven seats. The Liberal Democrats lost four of the five seats it was defending, all of which were gained by Labour. After the election, the composition of the council was:
Labour 43
Conservative 9
Liberal Democrats 6
Others 5

Result

Ward results
The results in each ward are shown below. Changes are compared with the previous election in 2007.

Adwick

Armthorpe

Askern Spa

Balby

Bentley

Bessacarr & Cantley

Central

Conisbrough & Denaby

Edenthorpe, Kirk Sandall & Barnby Dun

Edlington & Warmsworth

Finningley

Great North Road

Hatfield

Mexborough

Rossington

Sprotbrough

Stainforth & Moorends

Thorne

Torne Valley

Town Moor

Wheatley

References

2011 English local elections
2011
2010s in South Yorkshire